The Alpine A106  was the first of a line of light-weight glass-fibre bodied, rear-engined two-door coupés  produced for a young competition-oriented Dieppe based Renault dealer called Jean Rédélé.   The car was based on mechanical components from the Renault 4CV.

Origins

The car was inspired by the “Marquis” a Renault 4CV based coupé, a design acquired for production under licence in the United States but which had never entered production.   More direct inspiration came from the “Allemano”, another Renault 4CV based coupé prototype, and modified by Chappe et Gessalin, the firm that would assemble the early “glass fibre” bodied A106s for Alpine.

Under the skin, the A106 closely resembled the 4CV. The more sporting  “A106 Mille Miles” would derive from a competition version of the 4CV model developed by Renault.

The name
The number “106” also came from Renault. 1060, 1062 and 1063 were the reference numbers under which the 4CV had been registered with the French homologation authorities. The Alpine 107 was a steel-bodied prototype, which never entered production.

The launch
The emphasis at this stage was not on selling cars to the public but on chalking up successes in competition, indicating financial support from Renault for Alpine. Following on from the one-off “Marquis” and “Alemano” prototypes, in the summer of 1955 the first three Alpine A106s, painted respectively red, white and blue, were presented to Renault CEO Pierre Dreyfus in the yard at  Renault's large (though by now rather cramped) Billaincourt plant. The cars had been assembled by Chappe et Gessalin, in order to meet a special order received from Charles Escoffier, the owner of a large Paris based Renault dealership who also happened to be the father in law of Jean Rédélé.

From 1955 the little A106 started to accumulate a succession of victories, and various performance enhancing options were offered such as “Mille Miles (Mille Miglia) suspension” following A106 participation in the eponymous race. The Mille Miles specifications involve using four shock absorbers at the back, and was the suspension system later used for the Renault 8 Gordini. Also offered was a five-speed manual gear box manufactured under license: a five-speed gear box in a road car of this class was almost unheard of, and since the gearbox option alone came with a price tag sufficient to purchase 35% of a Renault 4CV, Alpine A106s incorporating the five-speed gear box option remained rare. In 1956 Jean Claude Galtier and Maurice Michy achieved a podium place and class victory for the A106 in the Mille Miglia race.

Commercialisation
Although the initial emphasis was on sporting success, in October 1957 the A106 made its first appearance at the Paris Motor Show. In 1957 Chappe et Gessalin relocated production facilities for the fibre-glass bodied cars from Saint-Maur to a new more spacious site (which a few years later became their headquarters) at Brie-Comte-Robert. This prepared the way for increasing production levels.

The A106 still came with the same little 747 cc Renault engine, but now three different power output versions were offered, providing respectively  at 4,100 rpm,  at 4,800 rpm or, on the “A106 Mille Miles”,  at 6,300 rpm. Performance differences correlated with different carburettors and higher compression ratios and, in the case of the fastest car,  of weight reduction.

The October 1957 Paris Motor Show also marked the first appearance of the Michelotti styled Alpine cabriolet. Subsequently, a closed coupé version of this car would also be produced ("coach" in French), and it would eventually become the Alpine A108. At this stage, however, the A106 continued to be the manufacturer's principal model, and by the time production ended around 650 had been produced.

A larger engined version of the car later appeared offering a maximum  of power from a 904 cc version of the Dauphine engine. In 1959 a tubular-framed backbone chassis version was introduced.

In 1960 emphasis switched from the A106 to the A108, and at some point during the next couple of years the last A106 was produced.   The A106 had established Alpine's credentials as an auto-brand, but it successor would be produced in significantly greater numbers and would become much better known than the A106 had managed.

References
Alpine. Tous les modèles. Toutes les années, par Dominique Pascal. Massin éditeur. 
Ulrich Bethscheider-Kieser; Mike Riedner (Publisher.): Autos die Geschichte machten. Renault Alpine. Motorbuch Verlag, Stuttgart 1991, S. 156, DNB 911285024

External links
 Histomobile, page dedicated to the A106 coupé and A106 cabriolet
Alpine 106 (in French)
Alpine A106 (in German)

Rear-engined vehicles
Rear-wheel-drive vehicles
A106
Rally cars
Sports cars
Cars introduced in 1955
First car made by manufacturer